Bjarne Hanssen (3 September 1917 – 29 December 2014) was a Norwegian politician for the Socialist Left Party.

He served as a deputy representative to the Parliament of Norway from Troms during the term 1973–1977. In total he met during 19 days of parliamentary session.

References

1917 births
2014 deaths
Deputy members of the Storting
Socialist Left Party (Norway) politicians
Troms politicians